Juan José Cañas Pérez (9 June 1826 – 19 January 1918) is known for possibly having written the Himno Nacional De El Salvador (national hymn of El Salvador) along with Italian-born composer Juan Aberle.

Cañas studied medicine at universities in Nicaragua and Guatemala before moving to El Salvador briefly. In 1848, he moved to San Francisco to make use of his medical degree.

Later in life, Cañas served as El Salvador's diplomatic ambassador to Chile. His poetry can be found at the Central American Poetic Gallery in the Salvadoran Garland.

Bibliography 

1826 births
1918 deaths
Salvadoran poets
Salvadoran male writers
Male poets
Salvadoran diplomats
National anthem writers
University of El Salvador alumni
Ambassadors of El Salvador to Chile
19th-century Salvadoran people